Croceibacter is a genus in the phylum Bacteroidota (Bacteria).

Etymology
The name Croceibacter derives from:Latin adjective croceus, saffron-colored; New Latin masculine gender noun, a rodbacter, nominally meaning "a rod", but in effect meaning a bacterium, rod; New Latin masculine gender noun Croceibacter, saffron-colored rod.

Species
The genus contains a single species, namely C. atlanticus ( Cho and Giovannoni 2003,  (Type species of the genus).; Latin masculine gender adjective atlanticus, of or pertaining to the Atlantic Ocean (a species isolated from the Atlantic Ocean).)

See also
 Bacterial taxonomy
 Microbiology

References 

Bacteria genera
Flavobacteria
Monotypic bacteria genera